Ipotanes or hippotaynes are mythical creatures; a race of half-horse, half-humans.  They are usually depicted as the reverse of centaurs, having human bodies with the heads of horses.  Although sometimes attributed to Greek mythology, the term appears to have originated at a much later date, and without a definite description; they are first mentioned in John de Mandeville's fourteenth-century Travels.  Ipotanes appear in modern works of the fantasy genre.

John de Mandeville
In his 1356 travelogue, The Travels of Sir John Mandeville, the author reports the existence of a violent race of ipotanes, found in Bacharie (Bactria).
  More recent editions of Mandeville's work use various spellings; hippotaynes (Macmillan, 1900), hippopotami (Penguin, 1983).

Description
The word "ipotane" appears to be derived from the Greek , "a knight".  Mandeville's description is not clearly distinguishable from that of a centaur, and some depictions use the term synonymously.  Other depictions show ipotanes with a human body and a horse's head, sometimes with the legs or tail of a horse.

Modern literature
Despite their similarity to centaurs, ipotanes are not mentioned in the corpus of Greek and Roman literature.  However, they appear in modern works of fantasy literature, in which they are depicted with various combinations of horselike and human features.

See also
 Glaistig - Scottish
 Hippopodes - Greek myth

References

Centaurs
Horses in mythology
Mythological human hybrids